Gila Mountains is the name of two mountain ranges along the Gila River in Arizona:
 The Gila Mountains (Graham County) in eastern Arizona
 The Gila Mountains (Yuma County) in southwestern Arizona

Additionally, Gila mountains is a term used to denote the ranges of the Gila River headwaters in New Mexico. These are:
 The Black Range
 The Mogollon Mountains
 The Mimbres Mountains

See also
 Gila Bend Mountains